Krishnakumar Ramakumar, also credited as Five Star Krishna, is an Indian actor who has appeared in Tamil films in supporting roles. He made his debut in Mani Ratnam's production Five Star (2002), before playing pivotal roles in Arinthum Ariyamalum and Saravana.

Career
Krishna, who had previously apprenticed under Rajiv Menon as an assistant director, was signed on by Susi Ganesan to appear in a leading role in Five Star, produced by Mani Ratnam. Portraying a runaway husband, he won rave reviews with The Hindu's critic noting "there are scenes where he could have underplayed his emotions a little — but surely the young man has talent". After winning good reviews for his performance in Five Star, Krishna followed it up playing supporting roles in films including Cheran's Autograph and as a student leader in Mani Ratnam's Aaytha Ezhuthu, while also appearing as Dhanush's brother in the romantic comedy, Thiruda Thirudi. He has since then notably appeared in projects directed by Vishnuvardhan, featuring in four consecutive ventures. He has balanced appearances in films alongside his advertisement agency.

In 2008, it was reported that he was set to direct a gangster film titled Madras starring Vishnuvardhan's brother Kreshna in the lead role, though the project did not materialise after a spat with the producer. Krishna has directed a commercial advertisement featuring Kamal Haasan.

Filmography

References

External links 
 

Indian male film actors
Male actors in Tamil cinema
Living people
Tamil comedians
Advertising directors
Year of birth missing (living people)